Gurmayum Anita Devi is a noted mountaineer from Indian state of Manipur. She was awarded Padma Shri award by Government of India in 2004 . She was also awarded the 1994 National Adventure Award for being part of historic 1993 Indo-Nepalese Women's Everest Expedition.

References 

Sportswomen from Manipur
Recipients of the Padma Shri in sports
Recipients of the Tenzing Norgay National Adventure Award
Indian female mountain climbers
Indian mountain climbers
Living people
21st-century Indian women
21st-century Indian people
Year of birth missing (living people)
Mountain climbers from Manipur